Teisserenc de Bort is an impact crater on Mars, at 0.4° N and 45.1° E. Most of it is in the Syrtis Major quadrangle. It measures  in diameter and was named after French meteorologist Léon Teisserenc de Bort (1855–1913). The name was adopted by IAU's Working Group for Planetary System Nomenclature in 1973. A picture below shows dark slope streaks. The darker the streak, the newer it is.

Images

See also 
 List of craters on Mars

References 

Impact craters on Mars
Syrtis Major quadrangle